Wadi Lusail is a district in Qatar, located in the municipality of Al Daayen.

In the 2015 census, it was listed as a district of zone no. 70 which has a population of 53,001 and also includes 11 other districts. 

It borders Al Sakhama to the south-west and Al Masrouhiya to the south-east.

Etymology
Acquiring its name from geographical features, "wadi" is the Arabic term used for dry river valleys, whereas "lusail" is a diminutive of "wassail", the local name of a plant found in large numbers nearby.

References

Populated places in Al Daayen